is the fourth single by Japanese rock band Field of View. The single charted #4 rank in Oricon for first week. It charted for 11 weeks. The song serves as the theme song to the anime series Dragon Ball GT, and the ending theme for Dragon Ball: The Path to Power. It sold a total of 528,150 copies.

The song was covered by songwriter Izumi Sakai, who was the original writer of the song, for Zard's 1996 album Today Is Another Day.

Track list
 "DAN DAN Kokoro Hikarete 'ku"
composer: Tetsurō Oda /lyricist: Izumi Sakai/arranger: Takeshi Hayama
 "Dear Old Days"
composer and lyricst: U-ya Asaoka/arranger: Akihito Tokunaga
 "Dan Dan Kokoro Hikareteku (Original Karaoke)"

Cover versions
DAN DAN Kokoro Hikarete 'ku has received many language variations due to the songs usage in Dragon Ball GT. Aside from Japanese, the song has been officially sung in 10 languages, with multiple variations. Rounding out to 17 different versions.

There are 2 English versions. Vic Mignogna sang a version of the song used for the FUNimation English dub release of Dragon Ball GT when FUNimation released a remastered version of the series with the original Japanese soundtrack intact. The lyrics are very faithful to the Japanese version but a recreated version of the instrumental was used instead of the original song. The Blue Water dub (an English dub of Dragon Ball and Dragon Ball GT only aired in the UK, Canada and the Netherlands) used a shorter version of this song with completely different lyrics compared to the original Japanese version. It's believed to have been sang by Adam Hunter, a voice actor for Blue Water Studios.

There a 3 Spanish versions, only 2 of which were used in their respective dubs. Mexico received a version titled "Mi corazón encantado," (My Enchanted Heart) sung by Aaron Montalvo. In 2018, the song was made into a full-length version released to a digital album by Aaron Montalvo himself. There's also a Spain/Castilian version titled "Ven, ven" (Come, Come). It was sung by Momo Cortés. A full-length version does exist. The last Spanish cover was never used in any official dub and was only released on CD and cassette in Chile. It's titled "Me cautiva tu sonrisa" (Your Smile Captivates Me) and was sung by Álvaro Véliz.

There are 3 Portuguese versions, one is Brazilian Portuguese, the other two are European Portuguese. The Brazilian variation is titled "Coração de criança," (Child's Heart) sung by Ricardo Fábio. A full-length version was released to YouTube via Tsb anime. The first European Portuguese variation was used for the episodes of Dragon Ball GT and was sung by Ricardo Spínola (uncredited). The song was given no title. A full-length version does not exist. The other European Portuguese variation was used exclusively for the Dragon Ball GT TV special. It was sung by Vasco Machado (uncredited), the voice of Goku in the European Portuguese dub. The song was given no title. A full-length version does not exist.

A Catalan version was also made. Although the dubbing of Dragon Ball Z had consistently used separate dubs between Catalan and Valencian, both languages can be understood interchangeably by those who speak them. As such, the Catalan dub of Dragon Ball GT was also the Valencian dub. The song wasn't given a title and was sung by Toni Ten (uncredited). A full-length version does exist, although has never been officially released in an unaltered format. The Catalan full-version was used during the ending montage in the last episode of Dragon Ball GT. This is the only language that does this, aside from Japanese.

A Galician version was also made. The song wasn't given a title and was sung by the duet of Nacho Castaño (uncredited) and Patricia de Lorenzo (uncredited).  A full-length version does not exist.

A Basque version was also made. The song wasn't given a title and was sung by the duet of Xeberri Castillo (uncredited) and Ana Lupe Fernández (uncredited).  A full-length version does not exist.

There are 2 German versions. The first of which was used in the German dub of the Dragon Ball GT TV special, released on DVD by Polyband in Germany. It's titled "Hand in Hand" (translates the same in English) and was sung by Carsten Schmelzer. A full-length version does not exist. The other variation was used in the later German dubbing of the Dragon Ball GT episodes by MME Studios Berlin. The song was performed by the German rock band "Anime Allstars" and sung by their lead singer Fred Röttcher. It's titled "Sorae" and has been featured in their official CD releases and online albums.

Although on CD and cassette only, a Thai version was also made. The Thai dubs of Dragon Ball GT (of which are the Modernine Thai dub and the DEX Thai dub) do not have unique opening songs. Rather, they have the original Japanese opening, with their own unique narrators saying the title of the series in Thai during the beginning logo card of the opening. The Thai version was released to CD and cassette in Thailand at some point during 2001, on the album "เพลงฮิต ไฮไลท์การ์ตูน 9 - ปาร์ตี้การ์ตูนดัง," (Hit Songs, Cartoon Highlights Vol. 9 - Famous Cartoon Party). It's the third track and is titled "แดน แดน" (literally "Dan Dan," but can be translated out to "Bit by Bit"). It was sung by จิรายุ ผ่องสุวรรณ (Jirayu Phongsuwan) and นัฏกร จาติกวนิช (Nattakorn Chatikavanich).

A Hebrew version was also made. The song wasn't given a title and was sung by אלי לולאי (Eli LuLai), the frontman of the band Rockfour. The lyrics in this version are about Gokus journey as the song was not translated as the love song it was originally. A full-length version does not exist.

There are 2 Korean versions. Both versions and their dubs were made in South Korea. The first of which was done by Daewon/Daiwon Donghwa via their VHS releases of the Dragon Ball franchise during the 90s. The song wasn't given a title and was sung by 방대식 (Bang Dae-Sik). A full-length version does not exist. The other variation was made by the South Korean TV network Tooniverse, during the early 2010s. The song is titled "점점  마음이  끌려" (Jeom Jeom Ma-Eum-I Kkeullyeo, "Bit by Bit, I’m Being Drawn") and was sung by 맹수민 (Maeng Su-Min). A full-length version does not exist.

References

1996 singles
Zard songs
Songs written by Izumi Sakai
Songs written by Tetsurō Oda
Dragon Ball songs
Japanese-language songs
Rock ballads
1996 songs